is a Japanese original television series of ten anime comedy short films that were broadcast on Kids Station in mid-2008.

Akiba-chan is the name of the main character, a posable figurine. Her name refers to the otaku obsession with collecting anime figurines and other merchandise (see Akiba-kei). She lives in an apartment house named Maison de Akiba. Four other girls share her easy-going, comic adventures. The anime uses a combination of computer animation (CGI) and a stop-motion technique named .

Voice cast
Ai Shimizu – 
Sayori Ishizuka – 
Mayuko Omimura – 
Saki Fujita – 
Ryoka Yuzuki –

Titles in other languages

Reception

Sources

External links
 
 

2008 anime films
2008 Japanese television series debuts
2008 Japanese television series endings
Anime series
Comedy anime and manga
Japanese animated films
Slice of life anime and manga